Ivan Barias is part of the Philadelphia production duo Carvin & Ivan. Initially starting out as a solo hip hop artist, he moved into production and songwriting. He has written and produced songs for artists including Jazmine Sullivan, Jill Scott, Musiq Soulchild, Justin Timberlake, Mario, Chris Brown, Ledisi, Raheem DeVaughn, Keyshia Cole, Jaheim, Estelle, Floetry, Skillz, Ace Hood, and Rick Ross.

Career
Along with Carvin Haggins, he is notable for introducing Musiq Soulchild to the world and giving him his staple sound. Together they were responsible for writing and producing the vast majority of Musiq's more popular charted singles such as "Just Friends (Sunny)", "Halfcrazy", "Dontchange", "B.U.D.D.Y.", and "Teachme".

Barias is the former president of the Philadelphia Chapter of The Recording Academy and now serves on the Academy's Board of Trustees. On February 1, 2011, he became a creative ambassador for the city of Philadelphia as a part of Greater Philadelphia Tourism Marketing Corporation's Philly 360°. In 2012 he was named as one of the brightest minds of Philadelphia in Philadelphia Magazines Innovation issue.

In 2011, Barias was selected as an ambassador of the Philadelphia 76ers community program La Liga del Barrio.

Early years
Carvin & Ivan met in the mid-90s at A Touch Of Jazz, a recording studio in Philadelphia owned by DJ Jazzy Jeff.

Discography

Selected discography as producer, songwriter, composer and engineer.

2000

Musiq Soulchild - Aijuswanaseing
"Just Friends (Sunny)" 
"Poparatzi"

2001

Jill Scott - Experience: Jill Scott 826+
"High Post Brotha" (featuring Common)
"Gimme"

Angie Stone - Mahogany Soul
"The Ingredients Of Love" (featuring Musiq Soulchild)

Lina - Stranger on Earth
"Bye Bye Baby" (produced by Ivan "Orthodox" Barias)

2002

Musiq Soulchild - Juslisen
"Newness"
"Caughtup"
"Stopplayin"
"Halfcrazy"
"Time"
"Solong"
"Bestfriend"
"Dontchange"
"Something"
"Ifiwouldaknew"

Justin Timberlake - Justified
"Worthy Of"

Dawn Robinson - Dawn
"Party, Party"
"Get Up Again"

Floetry - Floetic
"Headache"
"Opera"

Syleena Johnson - "Chapter 2: The Voice"
"Dear You"
"I'm Gon Cry"
"No Words"
"So Willingly"

2003

Musiq Soulchild - Soulstar
"Youloveme"
"Womanopoly"
"Forthenight"
"Infatueighties"
"Whoknows"
"Babymother"
"Missyou"
"Thereason"
"Romancipation"
"Givemorelove"

Joe - And Then...
"Ride Wit U" (featuring G-Unit)
"Another Used To Be"
"Testify"

Hootie & The Blowfish - Hootie & the Blowfish
"Little Brother"

2004

Jill Scott - Beautifully Human: Words and Sounds Vol. 2
"Bedda At Home"
"Family Reunion"

Mario - Turning Point
"Like Me Real Hard"

Planet Asia - The Grand Opening
"Pure Coke" (featuring Martin Luther)

Skillz - Okayplayer - True Notes Vol. 1
"Take It Back"

Toshinobu Kubota - Time to Share
"Breaking Through"
"Hope You'll Be Well"

2005

Faith Evans - The First Lady
"Again"
"I Don't Need It"
"Stop'n'Go"
"Jealous"
"Get Over You"
"Until You Came"

Chris Brown - Chris Brown's Journey
"So Glad"

Brian McKnight - Gemini
"She"

2006

2pac- Pac's Life
"Playa Cardz Right (Female)" (featuring Keyshia Cole)
"Scared Straight"

Heather Headley - In My Mind
"Losing you"

Keshia Chanté - 2U
"Kiss"

Javier Colon - Left of Center
"You're The One"
"Is This Love"
"Poetry"

2007

Musiq Soulchild - Luvanmusiq
"Teachme" (Grammy-nominated song: R&B Song of the Year 2008)
"Rewind"

2pac- Best of 2Pac Part 2: Life
"Dopefiend's Diner" (previously unreleased)

Freeway - Free at Last
"This Can't Be Real" (featuring Marsha Ambrosius)

Mýa - Liberation
"Lights Go Off"
"Switch It Up"

2008

Raheem DeVaughn - Love Behind the Melody
"Customer" (Grammy-nominated song: R&B Song of the Year 2009)

Jazmine Sullivan - Fearless
"Foolish Heart"

Keyshia Cole - A Different Me
"Playa Cardz Right" (featuring 2Pac)

Skillz- The Million Dollar Backpack
"Don't Act Like You Don't Know" (featuring Freeway)

2009

Musiq Soulchild - OnMyRadio
"ifyouleave" (featuring Mary J. Blige)
"deserveumore"
"special"
"someone"

Ledisi - Turn Me Loose
"Alone"
"I Need Love"

Ace Hood - Ruthless
"Champion" (featuring Jazmine Sullivan and Rick Ross)

Ameriie - In Love & War
"The Flowers"

2010

Jaheim - Another Round
"Finding My Way Back"

Faith Evans - Something About Faith
"Gone Already"

Skillz - The World Needs More Skillz
"Celebrate Life"
"Wants and Needs" (featuring Bilal)

Leela James - My Soul
"If It's Wrong"
"It's Over"

2011

Ledisi - Pieces Of Me
"I Gotta Get To You"

Jill Scott - The Original Jill Scott from the Vault, Vol. 1
"I Don't Know (Gotta Have You)"

2012

Estelle - All of Me
"The Life"

SWV - I Missed Us
"Love Unconditionally"

Kenny Lattimore - Back To Cool
"Find A Way"

Alex Boyd - Commit Me
"Wish I Knew"

Tamia - Beautiful Surprise
"Still Love You"

Q. Parker - The MANual
 "Belongs to You"
 "Completely"

2013

Chrisette Michelle - Better
"Let Me Win"
"Love Won't Leave Me Out"

Raheem DeVaughn - A Place Called Loveland
"Interlude - Album Intro"
"Love Connection"
"Wrong Forever" 
"Complicated"

TGT - Three Kings 
"Burn Out" (produced by Carvin Haggins and Ivan Barias with Javad Day)

Glenn Lewis - Moment of Truth
"Random Thoughts"
"Up & Down"
"Searching For That One"
"Closer" (co-produced by Stan Drinks)
"I Wanna Go Deep"

2014

Ledisi - The Truth
"88 Boxes"

Kiki Rowe - Kiki Rowe
"Too Goo To Be True"

2015

Jamie Foxx - Hollywood: A Story of a Dozen Roses 
"Right Now"

Estelle - We Bare Bears theme song
"We'll Be There"

Estelle - True Romance
"Time Share"

Ledisi - The Intimate Truth 
"I Swear"

Jill Scott - Golden Moments
"I Adore You"

Kenny Lattimore - Anatomy Of A Love Song
"Find A Way"
"You Have My Heart"
"What Must I Do"

2017

Bell Biv Devoe - Three Stripes 
"One More Try" featuring Boyz II Men

Ledisi - Let Love Rule 
"Forgiveness"

Stokley Williams - Introducing Stokley 
"Organic"
"Think About U"
"Cross The Line"
"Art In Motion" featuring Robert Glasper
"U & I" featuring Estelle
"We/Me"

Justin Timberlake - R&B Mixtape - Ministry of Sound 
"Worthy Of"

ThePLAYLIST - Chasing Goosebumps
"Stone Cold"

2019
DJ Aktive - The Tour (album)
"The City Intro"
"The City" featuring Common, DJ Jazzy Jeff, Freeway and Bri Steves
"90s Love" featuring Marsha Ambrosius
"It Is What It Is" featuring Musiq Soulchild
"Run For A Body" featuring LGP QUA
"The Apes" featuring Beanie Sigel, Capone and Khemist
"Repeat" featuring Brave Williams
"Pheels Like Home" featuring Raw Beauty
"The City Outro" featuring DJ Cash Money

Awards and nominations

Grammy Awards

|-
| rowspan="2"|  || "Halfcrazy" || Best Male R&B Vocal Performance || 
|-
| Juslisen || Best R&B Album || 
|-
| rowspan="1"|  || "Forthenight" || Best Urban/Alternative Performance || 
|-
| rowspan="1"|  || "Are You Experienced?" || Best Urban/Alternative Performance || 
|-
| rowspan="1"|  || Turning Point || Best Contemporary R&B Album || 
|-
| rowspan="3"|  || "Teachme" || Best R&B Song || 
|-
|  "B.U.D.D.Y." || Best Male R&B Vocal Performance || 
|-
| Luvanmusiq || Best R&B Album || 
|-
| rowspan="2"|  || "Customer" || Best R&B Song || 
|-
| Fearless || Best Contemporary R&B Album || 
|-
| rowspan="2"|  ||"IfULeave"  || Best R&B Performance by a Duo or Group with Vocals || 
|-
| Turn Me Loose || Best R&B Album || 
|-
| rowspan="5"|  || "Finding My Way Back"  || Best R&B Song || 
|-
| "Finding My Way Back" || Best Male R&B Vocal Performance || 
|-
| "Gone Already" || Best Female R&B Vocal Performance || 
|-
| Another Round || Best R&B Album || 
|-
| The Love & War MasterPeace || Best R&B Album || 
|-
| rowspan="1"|  || Pieces of Me || Best R&B Album || 
|-
| rowspan="2"|  || Better || Best R&B Album || 
|-
| Three Kings || Best R&B Album || 
|-
| rowspan="2"|  || Let Love Rule || Best R&B Album || 
|-

Ascap Awards
ASCAP Rhythm & Soul Awards
2002 "Just Friends (Sunny)"
2003 "Halfcrazy"
2004 "Dontchange"
2008 "B.U.D.D.Y."
2008 "Teachme"
2010 "IfULeave"
2011 "Finding My Way Back"

References

External links
 Official website
 Interview, HitQuarters Dec 2002

Hip hop record producers
American people of Dominican Republic descent